Basil Bertin (born 7 February 1992) is a Seychellois football midfielder who plays for Northern Dynamo FC. He was a squad member for the 2016 COSAFA Cup.

References 

1992 births
Living people
Seychellois footballers
Northern Dynamo FC players
Seychelles international footballers
Association football midfielders